The Prince Albert Raiders are a major junior ice hockey team in the Western Hockey League. The Raiders play in the East Division of the Eastern Conference. They are based in the city of Prince Albert, Saskatchewan, Canada. The team plays its home games at the Art Hauser Centre.

History

The early days
The Raiders started in 1971 as one of the most successful Tier II franchises in Canada, playing in the Saskatchewan Junior Hockey League (SJHL). Prince Albert won the Tier II national championship, the Manitoba Centennial Trophy, four times in a six-year span from 1977 to 1982. While competing for the Manitoba Centennial Trophy, the Raiders competed against a few future OHL teams, the Guelph Platers and the Belleville Bulls.  The Raiders also won 7 straight Anavet Cups between 1976 until 1982 against various champions of the Manitoba Junior Hockey League.

Terry Simpson was the team's coach for those six years in the SJHL. He stayed with the team for its first 4 years when it moved up to the WHL. The City of Prince Albert was granted a WHL expansion franchise for the 1982–83 season.

1984–85 season
Three years later, the Raiders were the best team in the WHL. Led by team captain Dan Hodgson, the team achieved the best regular season record in the WHL of 58 wins, 11 losses and 3 ties. The Raiders defeated the Calgary Wranglers, Medicine Hat Tigers and the Kamloops Blazers in the WHL playoffs to win the WHL championship. Other notable members of the 1984–1985 team were; Tony Grenier, Dave Pasin, Pat Elynuik, Dave Manson, Ken Baumgartner, Dave Goertz and Emanuel Viveiros.

The Raiders went on to compete for the 1985 Memorial Cup versus the Sault Ste. Marie Greyhounds, Verdun Junior Canadiens and the Shawinigan Cataractes. In a game that featured 108 minutes in penalties called, Prince Albert lost 6–2 to Shawinigan. The second game saw the Raiders beat Verdun 5 to 3 with 2 goals from defenceman Dave Goertz. In their third game, the Raiders defeated the Sault Ste. Marie 8 to 6, and Dan Hodgson had 5 assists in the match. The Raiders and Greyhounds would play each other again in the semi-finals and Prince Albert would prevail again by a score of 8 to 3. The Raiders won the Memorial Cup and became CHL champions by defeating the Shawinigan Cataractes 6–1 in the final.

2018–19 season
The Raiders finished the 2018–19 WHL season with a 54–10–2–2 record, 112 points, clinching the top seed in the Eastern Conference and the Western Hockey League. They defeated the Red Deer Rebels with a first round sweep, the Saskatoon Blades 4 games to 2, the Edmonton Oil Kings 4 games to 2, and finally the Vancouver Giants 4 games to 3, with a game seven overtime goal scored by Dante Hannoun to clinch the title on home ice. The Raiders claimed their second WHL Championship, and a berth in the 2019 Memorial Cup, where they failed to advance beyond the round-robin.

Championships

Memorial Cup Champions
 1985

Western Hockey League Champions
 1985, 2019

Eastern Conference Champions
 1985, 2019

Regular season title
 1985, 2019

WHL Eastern Division
 1985, 1992, 1999, 2019, 2020

Manitoba Centennial Cup Champions
 1977, 1979, 1981, 1982

Abbott Cup Champions
 1977, 1978, 1979, 1981, 1982

Anavet Cup Champions
 1976, 1977, 1978, 1979, 1980, 1981, 1982

Saskatchewan Junior Hockey League Champions
 1974, 1976, 1977, 1978, 1979, 1980, 1981, 1982

Current roster
Updated January 13, 2023.

 
 

 

 

 

 

 

 

 
 
 

 

|}

NHL alumni
Listed below are alumni from Prince Albert Raiders of the Saskatchewan Junior Hockey League (SJHL) and the Western Hockey League (WHL) who went on to play in the National Hockey League.

SJHL Raiders

Robin Bartell
Todd Bergen
Rollie Boutin
Ron Delorme
Gary Emmons
Bob Hoffmeyer
Brad McCrimmon
Dave Michayluk
Bill Oleschuk
Greg Paslawski
James Patrick
Darcy Regier
Dave Reierson
Dave Tippett
Bill Watson

WHL Raiders

Nolan Allan
Ryan Bast
Ken Baumgartner
Todd Bergen
Curtis Brown
Shawn Byram
Frederic Chabot
Kyle Chipchura
Brad Church
Byron Dafoe
Rod Dallman
Leon Draisaitl
Pat Elynuik
Todd Fedoruk
Joaquin Gage
Noah Gregor
Dave Goertz
Steve Gotaas
Kaiden Guhle
Scott Hartnell
Paul Healey
Jim Hiller
Shane Hnidy
Dan Hodgson
Kim Issel
Steve Kelly
Dan Kesa
Darin Kimble
Dean Kolstad
Milan Kraft
Gord Kruppke
Dale Kushner
Jeff Lank
Carson Latimer
Brett Leason
Jamie Linden
Ross Lupaschuk
Steve MacIntyre
Dave Manson
Dean McAmmond
Grant McNeill
Mike Modano
Josh Morrissey
Jeff Nelson
Todd Nelson
Dave Pasin
Denis Pederson
Chris Phillips
Richard Pilon
Aliaksei Protas
Nick Schultz
Cam Severson
Reid Simpson
Michal Sivek
Alan Stewart
Ryan Stewart
Kevin Todd
Shayne Toporowski
David Van Drunen
Darren Van Impe
Emanuel Viveiros
Roman Vopat
Wes Walz
Shane Willis

Season-by-season record
Note: GP = Games played, W = Wins, L = Losses, T = Ties OTL = Overtime losses Pts = Points, GF = Goals for, GA = Goals against

WHL Championship history
1984-85: Win, 4-0 vs Kamloops
2018-19: Win, 4-3 vs Vancouver

Playoffs
SJHL Years
1972 Lost Semi-final
Prince Albert Raiders defeated Weyburn Red Wings 4-games-to-2
Melville Millionaires defeated Prince Albert Raiders 4-games-to-2
1973 Lost Semi-final
Prince Albert Raiders defeated Yorkton Terriers 4-games-to-1
Humboldt Broncos defeated Prince Albert Raiders 4-games-to-none
1974 Won League, Lost Anavet Cup
Prince Albert Raiders defeated Humboldt Broncos 4-games-to-none 
Prince Albert Raiders defeated Saskatoon Olympics 4-games-to-none 
Prince Albert Raiders defeated Estevan Bruins 4-games-to-1  SJHL CHAMPIONS
Selkirk Steelers (MJHL) defeated Prince Albert Raiders 4-games-to-2
1975 Lost Final
Prince Albert Raiders defeated Saskatoon Olympics 4-games-to-1
Prince Albert Raiders defeated Battleford Barons 4-games-to-none
Swift Current Broncos defeated Prince Albert Raiders 4-games-to-2
1976 Won League, Won Anavet Cup, Lost Abbott Cup
Prince Albert Raiders defeated Battleford Barons 4-games-to-none 
Prince Albert Raiders defeated Swift Current Broncos 4-games-to-none 
Prince Albert Raiders defeated Weyburn Red Wings 4-games-to-none SJHL CHAMPIONS
Prince Albert Raiders defeated Selkirk Steelers (MJHL) 4-games-to-1 ANAVET CUP CHAMPIONS
Spruce Grove Mets (AJHL) defeated Prince Albert Raiders 4-games-to-1
1977 Won League, Won Anavet Cup, Won Abbott Cup, Won 1977 Centennial Cup
Prince Albert Raiders defeated Humboldt Broncos 4-games-to-none 
Prince Albert Raiders defeated Swift Current Broncos 4-games-to-1 
Prince Albert Raiders defeated Melville Millionaires 4-games-to-2 SJHL CHAMPIONS
Prince Albert Raiders defeated Dauphin Kings (MJHL) 4-games-to-1 ANAVET CUP CHAMPIONS
Prince Albert Raiders defeated Calgary Canucks (AJHL) 4-games-to-1 ABBOTT CUP CHAMPIONS
Prince Albert Raiders defeated Pembroke Lumber Kings (CJHL) 4-games-to-none CENTENNIAL CUP CHAMPIONS
1978 Won League, Won Anavet Cup, Won Abbott Cup, Lost 1978 Centennial Cup
Prince Albert Raiders defeated Battleford Barons 4-games-to-none
Prince Albert Raiders defeated Swift Current Broncos 4-games-to-3
Prince Albert Raiders defeated Moose Jaw Canucks 4-games-to-1 SJHL CHAMPIONS
Prince Albert Raiders defeated Kildonan North Stars (MJHL) 4-games-to-none ANAVET CUP CHAMPIONS
Prince Albert Raiders defeated Merritt Centennials (BCJHL) 4-games-to-1 ABBOTT CUP CHAMPIONS
Guelph Platers (OPJHL) defeated Prince Albert Raiders 4-games-to-none
1979 Won League, Won Anavet Cup, Won Abbott Cup, Won 1979 Centennial Cup final
Prince Albert Raiders defeated Battleford Barons 4-games-to-1
Prince Albert Raiders defeated Swift Current Broncos 4-games-to-3
Prince Albert Raiders defeated Moose Jaw Canucks 4-games-to-2 SJHL CHAMPIONS
Prince Albert Raiders defeated Selkirk Steelers (MJHL) 4-games-to-1 ANAVET CUP CHAMPIONS
Prince Albert Raiders defeated Fort Saskatchewan Traders (AJHL) 4-games-to-2 ABBOTT CUP CHAMPIONS
First in 1979 Centennial Cup round robin (3-1)
Prince Albert Raiders defeated Sherwood-Parkdale Metros (IJHL) 5-4 OT in final CENTENNIAL CUP CHAMPIONS
1980 Won League, Won Anavet Cup, Lost Abbott Cup
Prince Albert Raiders defeated Weyburn Red Wings 4-games-to-1
Prince Albert Raiders defeated Swift Current Broncos 4-games-to-2
Prince Albert Raiders defeated Moose Jaw Canucks 4-games-to-2 SJHL CHAMPIONS
Prince Albert Raiders defeated Selkirk Steelers (MJHL) 4-games-to-2 ANAVET CUP CHAMPIONS
Red Deer Rustlers (AJHL) defeated Prince Albert Raiders 4-games-to-2
1981 Won League, Won Anavet Cup, Won Abbott Cup, Won 1981 Centennial Cup final
Prince Albert Raiders defeated Battleford Barons 4-games-to-none
Prince Albert Raiders defeated Humboldt Broncos 4-games-to-none
Prince Albert Raiders defeated Moose Jaw Canucks 4-games-to-3 SAJHL CHAMPIONS
Prince Albert Raiders defeated St. Boniface Saints (MJHL) 4-games-to-1 ANAVET CUP CHAMPIONS
Prince Albert Raiders defeated St. Albert Saints (AJHL) 4-games-to-none ABBOTT CUP CHAMPIONS
First in 1981 Centennial Cup round robin (3-1)
Prince Albert Raiders defeated Belleville Bulls (OPJHL) 6-2 in final CENTENNIAL CUP CHAMPIONS
1982 Won League, Won Anavet Cup, Won Abbott Cup, Won 1982 Centennial Cup
Prince Albert Raiders defeated Humboldt Broncos 4-games-to-none
Prince Albert Raiders defeated Swift Current Broncos 4-games-to-none
Prince Albert Raiders defeated Yorkton Terriers 4-games-to-none SAJHL CHAMPIONS
Prince Albert Raiders defeated Fort Garry Blues (MJHL) 4-games-to-2 ANAVET CUP CHAMPIONS
Prince Albert Raiders defeated St. Albert Saints (AJHL) 4-games-to-1 ABBOTT CUP CHAMPIONS
Prince Albert Raiders defeated Guelph Platers (OJHL) 4-games-to-none CENTENNIAL CUP CHAMPIONS

WHL Years

See also
 List of ice hockey teams in Saskatchewan

References

External links
Raiders official web site

Defunct Saskatchewan Junior Hockey League teams
Sport in Prince Albert, Saskatchewan
Ice hockey teams in Saskatchewan
Ice hockey clubs established in 1972
Western Hockey League teams